Jin Kim may refer to:

 Jin Kim (violinist)
 Jin Kim (animator)